The 1982–83 season was Paris Saint-Germain's 13th season in existence. PSG played their home league games at the Parc des Princes in Paris, registering an average attendance of 24,420 spectators per match. The club was presided by Francis Borelli and the team was coached by Georges Peyroche. Dominique Bathenay was the team captain.

Summary

Paris Saint-Germain were the first Parisian club to play in Europe since the 1960s, when Racing Paris and Stade Français participated in the Inter-Cities Fairs Cup. The expectation was huge for 1982–83 and PSG strengthened their squad with European Golden Shoe winner Kees Kist, 1978 FIFA World Cup champion Osvaldo Ardiles and, most notably, Yugoslav wizard Safet Sušić, who remains to this day one of the club's greatest players ever. They joined an already well-rounded workforce featuring experienced players Dominique Bathenay, Dominique Baratelli, Dominique Rocheteau, Mustapha Dahleb and Nambatingue Toko as well as promising PSG Academy graduates Luis Fernandez, Jean-Claude Lemoult and Jean-Marc Pilorget.

The Red and Blues made their European debut away to Lokomotiv Sofia in the first round of the European Cup Winners' Cup. They lost 0–1 in Bulgaria, but played champagne football at home to win 5–1 with Toko scoring a superb half volley that sealed PSG's qualification. Following a comfortable victory over Swansea City, the quarter-final draw appeared to be perfect as Paris avoided top teams like Real Madrid, Barcelona, Bayern Munich or Inter Milan. The first leg against Belgian Cup winners Waterschei was the club's first major European meeting, reflected in the 49,575 fans present at the Parc, their all-time attendance record. PSG deservedly won 2–0 with a great performance from Fernandez, who scored the first goal. The result could have been larger, though, a fact they would regret. In the return leg, Paris lost 0–3 after extra time and were knocked out in a highly controversial match that saw them finish with nine men.

On the domestic scene, results were just as satisfying. PSG reached the league podium for the first time, finishing in 3rd place, and repeated the feat in the 1983 Coupe de France Final, this time against Nantes. Recently crowned French champions, the Canaries were headed for the league-cup double, leading at the break after overturning Pascal Zaremba's early strike. But PSG managed their own comeback in the second half as Sušić equalized and then assisted Toko for the winning goal, once again qualifying for the Cup Winners' Cup (3–2). The campaign ended on a sad note, though, as Georges Peyroche left the club to take a sabbatical year.

Players 

As of the 1982–83 season.

Squad

Out on loan

Transfers 

As of the 1982–83 season.

Arrivals

Departures

Kits 

French radio RTL was the shirt sponsor. French sportswear brand Le Coq Sportif was the kit manufacturer.

Friendly tournaments

Tournoi de Paris

Trofeo Ciudad de Palma

Competitions

Overview

Division 1

League table

Results by round

Matches

Coupe de France

Round of 64

Round of 32

Round of 16

Quarter-finals

Semi-finals

Final

European Cup Winners' Cup

First round

Second round

Quarter-finals

Statistics 

As of the 1982–83 season.

Appearances and goals 

|-
!colspan="16" style="background:#dcdcdc; text-align:center"|Goalkeepers

|-
!colspan="16" style="background:#dcdcdc; text-align:center"|Defenders

|-
!colspan="16" style="background:#dcdcdc; text-align:center"|Midfielders

|-
!colspan="16" style="background:#dcdcdc; text-align:center"|Forwards

|-
!colspan="16" style="background:#dcdcdc; text-align:center"|Players transferred / loaned out during the season

|-

References

External links 

Official websites
 PSG.FR - Site officiel du Paris Saint-Germain
 Paris Saint-Germain - Ligue 1 
 Paris Saint-Germain - UEFA.com

Paris Saint-Germain F.C. seasons
Association football clubs 1982–83 season
French football clubs 1982–83 season